Phú Mỹ is a district-level town of Bà Rịa–Vũng Tàu province in southeast Vietnam.  the town had a population of 175,872. The town covers an area of 333.84 km².

Phú Mỹ was formerly Tân Thành District, a rural district of Bà Rịa–Vũng Tàu province, with its district capital lying at Phú Mỹ township. In 2018, Tân Thành District was dissolved to form the new district-level town of Phú Mỹ.

The town seat lies at Phú Mỹ ward (former Phú Mỹ township). Phú Mỹ is a highly industrialized town with several industrial parks. It is the site of CS Wind's largest Vietnam wind tower factory.

Phú Mỹ is home to deep water ports replacing Saigon Port when the latter relocated here. Phú Mỹ Power Plant Complex with a total capacity of 4,000 MW contributes nearly 35% of Vietnam's electricity.

Port of Phú Mỹ
The Port of Phú Mỹ (pronounced foo-me) serves as the main deep water cargo port for Ho Chi Minh City, as well as for the resort town of Vũng Tàu. The port is 65 km from Ho Chi Minh City and 45 km from Vũng Tàu city.

Administrative divisions
The town is divided administratively into five wards and five communes:

 Châu Pha
 Hắc Dịch
 Mỹ Xuân
 Phú Mỹ
 Phước Hoà
 Sông Xoài
 Tân Hải
 Tân Hòa
 Tân Phước
 Tóc Tiên

References

Districts of Bà Rịa-Vũng Tàu province
Bà Rịa-Vũng Tàu province
County-level towns in Vietnam